Athletic Club Taipei, previously known as Andy Chen Academy, Is a professional football club based in Taipei, Taiwan that competes in the Taiwan Football Premier League, starting in 2022.

History
In 2010, the club started as a football academy, Little Peacock Club, and was later renamed as Andy Chen Academy.

In 2017, the academy collaborated with Chelsea F.C. Hong Kong Soccer School to introduce Chelsea F.C.'s youth training system to the academy. The academy committed $2 million NTD to build five artificial turf pitches.  Academy's owner, Chen Sing-an, planned to make the club to be the first Asian Football Confederation qualified Taiwanese football club. Their youth players can also play for their respective schools, colleges, or university in youth tournaments, to enable competitive football experience since their players' youth.

In 2020, their first-team was formed, with the self-proclaimed long and short-term ambitions of playing on Taiwan's top-flight league; representing Taiwan at the AFC Cup; and introducing their academy players to the first-team matches, as they were granted a Taiwan Club License, debuted in the 2020 Taiwan Challenge League.

They made their official debut on July 18, 2020, when they lost 5–2 away to CPC Corporation.
During the season, they earned 28 points in 14 matches. But, they still were unable to be promoted to the first division, as they finished in 3rd place. Despite having a 14 positive goal difference advantage, they finished 3 points behind second-placed Inter Taoyuan that season.

Their efforts were rewarded in 2021, winning the Taiwan Challenge League title by a tight margin, sitting above second-placed Ming Chuan University by just 2 points. With this 35-point campaign, they were successfully promoted without playing the promotion play-offs.

The club was rebranded and modernised as in the club's identity, including a name change. They changed their name from Andy Chen Academy to AC Taipei, on 31 March 2022.

AC Taipei debuted in the 2022 season of Taiwan's top-flight league against Taipower, when they lost 4–1, with Tsai Meng-cheng scoring their lone goal.

AC Taipei's reserve team has yet to win a place at the Taiwan Challenge League, the national football 2nd tier league, for the 2022 season. They played a single-leg qualification match against Kaohsiung F.C. by a draw conducted by the CTFA in 7 May, losing with a score of 0–2. Therefore, they did not secure a spot in the 2022 Challenge League.

Current squad

Records 
2022 Taiwan Football Premier League:

References

External links

2017 establishments in Taiwan
Football clubs in Taiwan
Association football clubs established in 2017
Works association football clubs in Taiwan